Paroline v. United States, 572 U.S. 434 (2014), is a case in which the United States Supreme Court ruled that to recover restitution under , the government or the victim must establish a causal relationship between the defendant's conduct and the victim's harm or damages. The decision vacated the appellate court decision, and remanded it. A legislative fix was subsequently proposed by Marci Hamilton. Ultimately, the Amy, Vicky, and Andy Child Pornography Victim Assistance Act of 2018 was introduced in response.

References

External links
 

2014 in United States case law
Restitution
United States Supreme Court cases
United States Supreme Court cases of the Roberts Court